Channabasavapurana is an epic shatpadi poem written by Virupakshapandita in Kannada. This book narrates the life story of Channabasavanna as the incarnation of lord Shiva.

References

Lingayat literature
Epic poems in Kannada